Mansour Belhani (born 1 January 1990) is an Algerian professional footballer. He currently plays as a forward for the Algerian Ligue 2 club Olympique de Médéa.

Club career
On August 18, 2011, Belhani was loaned out by ASO Chlef to Algerian Ligue Professionnelle 2 side Olympique de Médéa.

Statistics

Honours
 Won the Algerian Ligue Professionnelle 1 once with ASO Chlef in 2011

References

1990 births
Algerian footballers
Algerian Ligue Professionnelle 1 players
Algerian Ligue 2 players
ASO Chlef players
Living people
Olympique de Médéa players
People from Mostaganem
Association football forwards
21st-century Algerian people